Forno Canavese is a comune (municipality) in the Metropolitan City of Turin in the Italian region Piedmont, located about  northwest of Turin.

Forno Canavese borders the following municipalities: Pratiglione, Corio, Rivara, Rocca Canavese, and Levone.

References

Cities and towns in Piedmont
Canavese